Funairi-hon-machi is a Hiroden station on the Hiroden Eba Line located in Funairi-hon-machi, Naka-ku, Hiroshima. It is operated by the Hiroshima Electric Railway.

Routes
There are three routes that serve Funairi-hon-machi Station:
 Hiroshima Station - Eba Route
 Yokogawa Station - Eba Route
 Hakushima - Eba Route

Station layout
The station consists of two staggered side platforms serving two tracks. Crosswalks connect the platforms with the sidewalk. There is a shelter located in the middle of each platform.

Adjacent stations

Bus connections
Hiroden Bus Route #6 at "Funairi-hon-machi" bus stop

Surrounding area
Funairi-hon-machi Syoutengai
Municipal Kanzaki Elementary School
Hiroshima Prefectural Medical Association

History
Opened on December 28, 1943.

See also

Hiroden Streetcar Lines and Routes

References

Funairi-hon-machi Station
Railway stations in Japan opened in 1943